Mr. Munchausen is a novel by John Kendrick Bangs, written in the style that has become known as Bangsian fantasy. It is the fourth book of Bangs' Associated Shades series.

Title
The book's full title is:
Mr. Munchausen: Being a True Account of Some of the Recent Adventures Beyond the Styx of the Late Hieronymus Carl Friedrich, Sometime Baron Munchausen of Bodenwerder, as originally reported for the Sunday Edition of the Gehenna Gazette by its special interviewer the late Mr. Ananias formerly of Jerusalem, and now first transcribed from the columns of that journal by J. K. Bangs
This is a satire of the long book and chapter titles often prevalent in the 18th and 19th centuries, and a reference to the adventures of the original Baron Munchausen. In various library, collectibles, and sales catalogs the long title of the book is usually truncated in various ways.

Publication history
Originally printed by Noyes, Platt & Co., Boston, US, in 1901, it was reprinted by Books for Libraries Press (1969), .

References

External links

 

Bangsian fantasy
1901 American novels
American fantasy novels
1901 fantasy novels
Novels about the afterlife